This article is about music-related events in 1824.

Events 
May 7 – First performance of Beethoven's Symphony No. 9 (the "Choral") at the Theater am Kärntnertor in Vienna.
June 21 – Franz Liszt makes his London debut. Muzio Clementi, Ferdinand Ries, Friedrich Kalkbrenner and Cipriani Potter are in the audience.
Baluswami Dikshitar (brother of Muthuswami Dikshitar) is appointed State Vidwan of Ettayapuram.
Franz Liszt commences theory lessons with Antonin Reicha and composition lessons with Ferdinando Paer.
First Norfolk and Norwich Festival held in England

Popular Music 
Robert Stephen Hawker – "The Song of the Western Men"
"O Tannenbaum" lyrics published by Ernst Anschutz

Classical music 
Ludwig van Beethoven
Missa Solemnis
Symphony No. 9 in D minor "Choral"
Hector Berlioz – Messe solennelle
Ferdinando Carulli – 18 Petits morceaux, Op. 211
Frederic Chopin – Mazurka Op. 7 No. 4
Johann Baptist Cramer – Piano Sonata, Op. 63
Carl Czerny – Piano Sonata Nos.3, 4, and 5, Op. 57, 65 and 76
Friedrich Ernst Fesca – String Quartet, Op.34
Fanny Hensel – Sonata for Piano in C minor
Johann Nepomuk Hummel – Introduction et rondo brillant, Op. 98
Friedrich Kuhlau 
3 Grand Solos, Op. 57
3 Sonatinas, Op. 59
3 Sonatas with Variations, Op. 60
Kaspar Kummer – Flute Trio, Op. 24
Maximillian Joseph Leidesdorf – Horn Sonata, Op. 164
Felix Mendelssohn 
Symphony No. 1 in C minor, Op. 11
 Concerto for 2 pianos
Bernhard Molique – Flute Concerto, Op. 69
George Onslow 
Piano Trio No.8, Op. 26
Piano Trio No.9, Op. 27
Antoine Reicha – 6 Piano Trios, Op. 101
Ferdinand Ries – Rule Britannia, Op. 116
Franz Schubert: List of compositions by Franz Schubert (1824),  799–822, including:
 Octet, D 803
 String Quartet No. 13, D 804 (Rosamunde)
 String Quartet No. 14, D 810 (Death and the Maiden)
 Sonata in C major for piano four-hands, D 812
 "Gebet", D 815
 Arpeggione Sonata, D 821 (Grand Duo)

Opera 
Gaetano Donizetti – L'ajo nell'imbarazzo
Friedrich Kuhlau – Lulu
Giacomo Meyerbeer – Il crociato in Egitto
Waldemar Thrane – Fjeldeventyret ("The mountain adventure")
Nicola Vaccai
Pietro il grande (première January 17 at Teatro Ducale, Parma)
La pastorella feudataria (première September 18 at Teatro Carignano, Turin)

Births 
January 22 – Josef Leopold Zvonař, composer, music teacher and critic (d. 1865)
March 2 – Bedřich Smetana, composer (d. 1884)
March 7 – Robert Ambrose, organist and composer (d. 1908)
April 22 – Richard Wüerst, composer and music teacher (d. 1881)
June 13 – Julius Eichberg, composer (d. 1893)
June 23 – Carl Reinecke, pianist, conductor and composer (d. 1910)
August 1 – John P. Ordway, doctor, composer, music entrepreneur, and politician (d. 1880)
August 19 – Georg Goltermann, cellist and composer (d. 1898)
September 4 – Anton Bruckner, composer (d. 1896)
September 8 – Jaime Nunó, composer of the Mexican national anthem (d. 1908)
November 25 – Antonio Ghislanzoni, librettist (d. 1893)
date unknown
François Xavier Bazin, bow-maker (d. 1865)
Velvel Zbarjer, Brody singer (d. 1884)
Charlotta Norberg, ballerina (d. 1892)
Frederick Ellard (d. 1874)

Deaths 
January 7 – Faustino Arévalo, hymnographer (born 1747)
February 1 – Maria Theresia von Paradis, musician and composer (born 1759)
March 3 – Giovanni Battista Viotti, violinist and composer (born 1755)
April 18 – Edward Jones, royal harpist (born 1752)
June 21 – Étienne Aignan, opera librettist (born 1773)
September 16 – Giacomo Tritto, opera composer (born 1733)
December 5 – Anne Louise Boyvin d'Hardancourt Brillon de Jouy, harpsichordist (born 1744)
date unknown
Nicolas Lupot, luthier (born 1758)
Alexander Uber, cellist and composer (born 1783)
probable – János Bihari, violinist (born 1764)

References

 
19th century in music
Music by year